Sidney Fennelly (22 March 1887 – 25 August 1964) was an Australian cricketer. He played in twenty-one first-class matches for Queensland between 1909 and 1921.

See also
 List of Queensland first-class cricketers

References

External links
 

1887 births
1964 deaths
Australian cricketers
Queensland cricketers
Cricketers from Sydney